Fear Fun is the first studio album released by American folk musician Josh Tillman under his pseudonym Father John Misty. It was released on April 30, 2012, in the UK and Europe on Bella Union, and in the rest of the world on May 1, 2012, on Sub Pop Produced by both Tillman and Jonathan Wilson, the album was released following Tillman's departure from Fleet Foxes.

The album debuted at No. 43 on Top Rock Albums and at No. 123 on Billboard 200, with 4,000 copies sold in its first week. It has sold 83,000 copies in the US as of February 2015.

Background and recording
In 2009, Josh Tillman decided that he no longer wished to record under the pseudonym J. Tillman. In 2012, he stated, "I remember specifically finishing Year in the Kingdom and then beginning to work on what would become Singing Ax, and I clearly knew Singing Ax was going to be the last "J. Tillman" record ever because I just didn't want to do it anymore."

Underlining this change in character and the choosing of the new moniker, Tillman admits the following in an interview for the Dallas Observer: "I used to do these J. Tillman shows and I would play my sad-wizard, Dungeons and Dragons music and watch people's eyes glaze over [...] Then, in between songs, I would start being myself and shooting the shit and telling jokes. ... All of a sudden, people were rapt with attention and I had this very devastating and sobering realization that I was way better at that part of the show than the music part."

In addition to the quote above Tillman states that personally he wasn't pleased with the slow and sad style his music was often associated with: "Songwriting for me had always only been interesting and necessary because I saw it as this vehicle for truth, but I had this realization that all I had really done with it was lick my wounds for years and years, and become more and more isolated from people and experiences. I don’t even like wound-licking music, I want to listen to someone rip their arm off and beat themselves with it. I don’t believe that until now I’ve ever put anything at risk in my music. I was hell-bent on putting my preciousness at stake in order to find something worth singing about."

This contrast between the music he was making and the person he really was led to a crisis concerning his work as a musician: "I lost all interest in writing music, or identifying as a ‘songwriter’. I got into my van with enough mushrooms to choke a horse and started driving down the coast with nowhere to go. After a few weeks, I was writing a novel, which is where I finally found my narrative voice. The voice that is actually useful. It was a while before that voice started manifesting in a musical way, but once I settled in the Laurel Canyon spider-shack where I’m living now, I spent months demoing all these weird-ass songs about weird-ass experiences almost in real-time, and kind of had this musical ‘Oh-there-I-am’ moment, identical to how I felt when I was writing the book. It was unbelievably liberating. I knew there was never any going back to the place I was writing from before, which was a huge relief. The monkey got banished off my back."

The "monkey" he's speaking about is specified in an interview for No Depression as a wrong idea of oneself: "When I was in high school I wanted to be an obscure singer-songwriter. I really wanted to be one of those guys that nobody knew about, and in some weird way, I fulfilled that. It all makes perfect sense to me. I wanted to be like Townes Van Zandt, Nick Drake, or Gram Parsons. Somebody who was respected but unknown. That was the most romantic thing to me. Guys like Richard Buckner. And as I was doing those records, I felt like I was part of the club, and I got to meet some of those guys. It was like I got invited into the inner sanctum. I was really into it for a long time, but I just ran out of things to do in it. [...] At some point, I realized that in order to go where I needed to go, and where I wanted to creatively, I had to kill that mythology and I had to kill that idea. I said to myself "You are not "that", you are a man." You have to not want to be anyone else, or want to be "anything" else. You have to just be what you are. I realized that I am a smart-ass, and that I have always been a kind of smart-ass. So when I realized that, I realized that I had an obligation to start including my sense of humor and my actual, true, conversational voice in my music in order for it to be exclusive to me, and not to be just my best stab at trying to be a preexisting idea."

Not fulfilling preexisting ideas Tillman used some sort of arbitrariness finding his new moniker 'Father John Misty'. For TheVine he explained himself as following: "I had to give it a name, so I kind of wanted to confuse people with this ridiculous red herring [and] admittedly patently ridiculous name that’s also phonetically beautifully and looks good in print. Sort of a name I’ve decided to give to this weird, subconscious, dream fragmentation I have of this homosexual, shamanic drifter who bounces around [and] stirs up weird shit in my dreams. Like making out with my brother. So I guess the aggregate of all those things just felt right. But really and truly, the whole thing is just kind of about the fact that it really doesn’t matter what the fuck you call yourself, as long as the goods are in the explicit honesty."

Track listing

Music videos

Personnel

Musicians
 Josh Tillman – performance
 Keefus Green – piano , synthesizers , mellotron 
 Wylie Gelber – bass guitar 
 Hugo Nicolson – omni-chord programming 
 Gabriel Noel – strings , upright bass 
 Ben Peeler – pedal steel 
 Leslie Stevens – backing vocals 
 Zach Tillman – bass guitar 
 Sara Watkins – fiddle 
 Casey Wescott – bass frequency , harpsichord , piano 
 Jonathan Wilson – electric guitar , bass guitar , piano , 12-string guitars , mandolin , pedal construction , VOX organ , Hammond organ , Wurlitzer , trumpet , acoustic guitars , baritone guitar 

Production
 Jonathan Wilson – production, engineering
 Josh Tillman – production
 Hugo Nicolson – engineering
 Wylie Gelber – assistant engineering
 Phil Ek – mixing
 Greg Calbi – mastering

Design
 Dimitri Drjuchin – cover painting, interior artwork
 Emma Garr – insert photo
 Jeff Kleinsmith – design
 Sasha Barr – design

References

External links
Father John Misty on Sub Pop
Fear Fun on Sub Pop

2012 albums
Josh Tillman albums
Sub Pop albums
Bella Union albums
Albums produced by Jonathan Wilson (musician)
Albums produced by Josh Tillman